Still Open All Hours is a British sitcom created for the BBC by Roy Clarke, and starring David Jason and James Baxter. It is the sequel to the sitcom Open All Hours, which both Clarke and Jason worked on throughout its 26-episode run from 1976 to 1985, following a 40th Anniversary Special in December 2013 commemorating the original series. The sitcom's premise focuses on the life of a much older Granville, who now runs his late uncle's grocery shop with the assistance of his son, continuing to sell products at higher prices alongside seeking to be with his love interest.

Unlike the original series, the cast for Still Open All Hours includes a more regular group of characters and additional side-plots. It has featured the return of Lynda Baron, Stephanie Cole, and Maggie Ollerenshaw as their characters from Open All Hours. Although the special received poor reviews, it attracted positive viewing figures, with the sitcom airing a total of 41 episodes across six series. A seventh series had been commissioned in 2019, but was delayed by the COVID-19 pandemic and despite plans to record it, the series was eventually cancelled in 2023, with the BBC saying it had no plans for any new episodes.

Premise
Like Open All Hours, the sitcom is set within a small grocer's shop in the suburb of Balby, within Doncaster, South Yorkshire, and focuses on the life of Granville (David Jason) – now much older and the shop's owner, having grown into the same sort of person as his late uncle Arkwright was by learning from him his many ways of selling to customers. Assisting him in running the shop is Leroy (James Baxter), Granville's son by one of his previous girlfriends, who maintains a rather robust love life with several girls but struggles to cope with the work and sales approach of his father, much as Granville did with Arkwright.

Granville maintains a love life with the sweet but absent-minded Mavis (Maggie Ollerenshaw) who loves him in return, but finds his path to her often blocked by her sister Madge (Brigit Forsyth), a miserable woman who does not like men and chooses to keep Mavis from following a relationship with Granville. Both are regular customers of the shop, alongside others from the neighbourhood onto whom Granville tries to offload products which he has bought and had little success selling on under their original identity and price.

Characters

Granville

Since Open All Hours, having lived his youth as a nice but shy and awkward man who struggled with shop life, Granville has changed into a more toned-down version of his uncle Arkwright. Thanks to his uncle's training, he now exhibits a similar habit of selling goods at inflated prices, fabricating stories to sell useless and/or unsaleable items to hapless customers, and keeping a close watch on the money he spends – often through employing the use of a special money belt that causes slight issues and embarrassment at times. During his uncle's training, Granville engaged in relationships with several girlfriends, in which a fling in Blackpool resulted in the procreation of his son Leroy, whom he was left in charge of by the boy's mother. Following his uncle's death, Granville inherited the shop, which he runs alongside Leroy, often teasing his son over the identity of his mother – secretly concealing the fact that he knows who she is – while subjecting him to practical jokes and teaching him some of the tricks that Arkwright taught him. In Still Open All Hours he maintains a belief that his uncle lives on through the shop's till, often referring to it as Arkwright in later episodes, because of its propensity to open or close suddenly at times for various reasons (such as when there is mention of spending considerable money on something). Arkwright's framed portrait on the wall sometimes tilts when spoken to. Two episodes featured Arkwright's ghost turning lights on and off (Series 1, Episode 6, and the 2015 Christmas Special).

Like his uncle, Granville has a love interest of his own in Mavis, a woman he met during his youth and whom he still fondly loves. Unlike his uncle, Granville must struggle to be with Mavis since the end of her previous marriage, due to her sister Madge desiring to keep them apart. To try to distract Madge and hopefully remove her as an obstacle, Granville spends his time grooming one of his regulars, Gastric, into becoming Madge's love interest. In later episodes, he also finds himself trying to stop the advances of widow Delphine Featherstone, one of his uncle's customers (to whom he accidentally sent a love note that was meant for Mavis), by persuading fellow widower, Wilburn Newbold, to enter a relationship with her and maintain it, despite Mrs Featherstone's presence unnerving him.

Leroy
Leroy was born to a mother who his father met during a fling in Blackpool, but who he does not know about, despite Granville secretly knowing who she is; although his mother is talked about during the first series, including a visit by her to see Leroy, references about her become rare and non-existent in later episodes. Left in his father's care by his mother at a young age, Leroy suffers similar issues to those that Granville faced in his youth, such as having to be up early to open the shop, being on the receiving end of his father's practical jokes, and handling the deliveries of purchases to customers. Unlike his father, Leroy maintains an active social life with many young women, most having boyfriends that they do not mind ignoring to spend time with him (much to his father's dismay), while displaying a firm dislike of his father's penchant for unloading products he buys cheaply but cannot sell. By the fourth series, Leroy becomes committed to winning the affection of a local librarian, despite her values and vegan lifestyle.

Main/Recurring Characters

Episodes

Forty-one episodes of Still Open All Hours, all written by Roy Clarke, have been produced for the BBC. The show began airing on 26 December 2013 with an anniversary special of original series, Open All Hours All episodes had a running time of 30 minutes. Between Open All Hours and Still Open All Hours, there have been a total of 67 episodes and ten series broadcast between 1973 and 2019.

Production

Series development
Still Open All Hours was first broadcast on 26 December 2013, with Jason reprising his role of Granville from Open All Hours. The new one-off episode written by Clarke showed Granville now running the shop with his son Leroy (played by James Baxter), after inheriting it from Arkwright. Clarke wrote the script in two weeks, and production began in October 2013. The exterior scenes were filmed at the original location at Lister Avenue in Doncaster from 18 to 20 November 2013. The interior scenes were recorded on 3 December 2013 at dock10 studios in Salford in front of a studio audience. A 30-minute documentary accompanying the show's return, entitled Open All Hours: A Celebration, aired on 27 December 2013, the day after the new episode was broadcast, on BBC One.

On 30 January 2014, the BBC commissioned Still Open All Hours for six new episodes beginning on 26 December 2014. The controller of BBC comedy commissioning, Shane Allen, said: "The resounding success of the Christmas revival showed the huge and enduring audience affection for this much-loved classic. Roy has done a terrific job of updating the characters whilst keeping what was warm-hearted and enjoyable about the world of the original series."

Production for series one began in August 2014, exterior filming started on 15 September and location work was completed on 26 September 2014. Interior scenes were recorded in front of a studio audience from 10 October until 21 November 2014 at Teddington Studios.

The show later returned for a second series, beginning on 26 December 2015. with production starting in September 2015. Exterior scenes were shot on location from 14–24 September 2015. Interior scenes were recorded before a studio audience at Pinewood Studios from 9 October until 20 November 2015.

In January 2016, David Jason said a third series would be produced during the year. The series began airing on 26 December 2016. Production started in September 2016 with on location for exterior scenes being shot in Balby Doncaster from 12 September 2016. Lynda Baron could not reprise her role as Nurse Gladys Emmanuel as the scheduled production dates clashed with Baron's EastEnders contract.

David Jason announced that a fourth series would be produced in 2017. Recording began in September 2017 with David Jason seen on location in Doncaster with co-star Tim Healy. The series began airing on 28 December 2017. Interior scenes were recorded at Pinewood Studios in front of a live studio-audience on 7, 14, and 21 October and on the 4, 11, 18, and 24 November 2016.
In early 2017 a fourth series was commissioned with production beginning in August 2017. On location exterior scenes for the fourth series commenced on 11 September 2017 in Doncaster. For the original special and the first three series, all episodes were filmed in front of a studio audience. Series 4 was, by contrast, filmed on a closed set and screened to an audience for recording of a laughter track, due to cast availability problems. 
Series 5 and 6 continued in this vein.

In January 2018, it was announced the show will return for a fifth series late 2018. The fifth series was officially confirmed on 2 May 2018, with filming due to commence in the summer. On 21 December 2018, the BBC confirmed a sixth series that was commissioned for transmission in late in 2019.

Filming locations

The exterior shots reused the original shop from the series, on Lister Avenue in Balby, a suburb of Doncaster. The shop had to be extensively redressed (for both programmes) to resemble a traditional corner shop, as it has been a hair salon known as Beautique since 1962. This process took two days, before filming on location for three consecutive days. The hair salon "Beautique" is listed on Google Maps as "Arkwright's."

The studio recordings for the 2013 special were recorded at Dock10 at MediaCityUK. For the first series, Teddington Studios were used and the second, third, fourth, fifth and sixth series were all recorded at Pinewood Studios.

Broadcast and reception
The special was broadcast on BBC One on 26 December 2013 and received 9.43m (39.9% of the audience) viewers according to overnight figures and was the most watched programme on that day. Final viewing figures showed that it was watched by 13.07m and was the most watched programme for that week. It received generally poor reviews from critics. Will Dean of The Independent, referencing Arkwright's trademark stutter, called it "a w-w-worthy effort" but criticised the attempt to revive the show without Ronnie Barker, who had died in 2005. Ben Lawrence of The Telegraph said it "felt like a relic of another era" criticising the jokes and Jason's performance. Jacob Mason, writing on the Radio Times website, described the show as "warmly nostalgic", whilst others noted it as "a fitting tribute to Ronnie Barker".

DVD releases
Although filmed and broadcast in High-definition, no Blu-ray releases have been announced. Series 1 and the 2013 Christmas Special was released on DVD on 2 February 2015 by 2 entertain. Series 2 was released on 1 February 2016. Series 3 was released on 13 February 2017. Series 4 was released on 19 February 2018. Series 5 was released on 7 January 2019. Series 6 was released on 6 January 2020.

References

External links

 .
 
 Image of Arkwright's shop in April 2007

2013 British television series debuts
2019 British television series endings
2010s British sitcoms
BBC high definition shows
BBC television sitcoms
English-language television shows
Sequel television series
Television series by BBC Studios
Television series produced at Pinewood Studios
Television series set in shops
Television shows set in South Yorkshire
Television shows shot at Teddington Studios
Television productions cancelled due to the COVID-19 pandemic